The Wallabee Champ is an unofficial compilation album by American rapper and Wu-Tang Clan member Ghostface Killah. The album is a collection of b-sides and remixes.

Track listing

References

Ghostface Killah albums
2008 compilation albums